This is a list of countries (or regions) by total road network size, both paved and unpaved. Also included is additional data on the length of each country's or region's controlled-access highway network, also known as motorway, expressway, freeway and so forth (they are known by different names in various places), designed for high vehicular traffic.

Unless otherwise noted, the data is from the CIA.

* indicates Roads in Country/Territory links.

See also 
 Highway systems by country
 List of longest highways
 List of controlled-access highway systems

Notes

References

Sources

Road network
Countries by road network size